Francisco Antonio de Bances y López-Candamo (April 26, 1662 – September 8, 1704) was a playwright of the Spanish Golden Age.

1662 births
1704 deaths
Spanish dramatists and playwrights
Spanish male dramatists and playwrights